John T. Satriale (July 13, 1919 – November 2017) was an American lawyer and politician from New York.

Life
He was born on July 13, 1919, in New York City, the son of Gaudioso Satriale (1884–1968). He attended Public School No. 6, and DeWitt Clinton High School. He graduated from Fordham College, and LL.B. from Brooklyn Law School.

Satriale was a member of the New York State Assembly from 1949 to 1965, sitting in the 167th, 168th, 169th, 170th, 171st, 172nd, 173rd, 174th and 175th New York State Legislatures. He was Chairman of the Committee on Ways and Means in 1965. In September 1965, after re-apportionment, he ran in the 89th District for re-nomination, but was defeated in the Democratic primary by Robert Abrams. He died in November 2017 at the age of 98.

Sources

1919 births
2017 deaths
Brooklyn Law School alumni
DeWitt Clinton High School alumni
Fordham University alumni
Democratic Party members of the New York State Assembly
Politicians from the Bronx